Mehikoorma is a small borough in Räpina Parish, Põlva County in southeastern Estonia.

References

Boroughs and small boroughs in Estonia
Populated places in Põlva County